Mariolumne Dome is a granite dome, in the Tuolumne Meadows region of Yosemite National Park.

Mariolumne Dome's particulars

With a freestanding height of  feet, it is second only to Fairview Dome. At its foot on the north lies Drug Dome. To the west and south is the long wall of Medlicott Dome, forming the western rampart of a common massif.

Mariuolumne Dome's main attraction is its rock climbing routes, though its height makes it worth hiking. On the east side, it is easy class 2, readily accessible via trail and some cross country.

On the origin of the name Mariolumne Dome

Mariuolumne is a concatenation of the names Mariposa and Tuolumne; the border between the two counties is near the base of Mariolumne Dome.

From the summit

From Marioulumne Dome's top, one has a panoramic view of Tuolumne high country: Cathedral Peak and Eichorn's pinnacle are near to the east; Tresidder Peak and Tenaya Peaks are to the south; Tenaya Lake, Pywiack Dome and Stately Pleasure Dome are to the southwest; and Fairview Dome and Daff Dome to the northeast.

Rock climbing

Mariolumne Dome has a number of rock climbing routes.

References

External links and references

 On climbing the classic 5.7 Hobbit Book
 On climbing Serrated Edge

Granite domes of Yosemite National Park